Towcester was a railway station on the Stratford-upon-Avon and Midland Junction Railway which served the town of Towcester in Northamptonshire, England between 1866 and 1964. 

It once served as an interchange for services to Stratford, Banbury and Olney. It also saw substantial traffic on racedays at Towcester Racecourse. Its closure came as the various interconnecting lines to the station closed one by one in the 1950s and 1960s. Passenger services ended in 1952, predating the Beeching closures.

History

Opening 
In 1863, the Northampton & Banbury Junction Railway (N&BJ), a forerunner of the Stratford-upon-Avon and Midland Junction Railway (SMJ), received Parliamentary authorisation to construct an  line from the London and North Western Railway's Blisworth station on their London to Birmingham line to Cockley Brake junction, at which point the new branch would form a junction with the existing Banbury to Verney Junction Branch Line. The public opening of the section of line from Blisworth to Towcester took place on 30 April 1866, with Towcester station formally opening to traffic the next day. The remainder of the line was finally opened by 1 June 1872.

Station buildings and layout 
The station was a major centre of the SMJ. It was the only station on the line to have three platform faces (one up and two down platforms), and the down platforms were linked to the up platform by the line's only footbridge. The main station buildings, a two-storey gabled structure built of brick, were situated on the up platform. A small platform canopy projected from the front of this building, with its central section unusually raised in an inverted "V". Small single-storey extensions flanked either side of the main building. Inside the building, there was a booking office, waiting room and toilet facilities, as well as accommodation for the stationmaster.

This required a signal box at each end of Towcester station and a third at the junction. Amalgamation resulted in the abolition of the junction and its replacement with two separate tracks running parallel from Towcester before separating at Greens Norton. The three signal boxes were replaced by a new high box at the Blisworth end of the down platform, to which access could be had from the footbridge. This was altered in 1926 when the London, Midland and Scottish Railway (LMSR), which had taken over the line upon the railway grouping, installed a new footbridge and separate steps were provided to the box.

Traffic 

Until 1893, Towcester served as a junction station for services to Olney railway station, as well as an interchange for Blisworth to Banbury services and Blisworth to Stratford services. Around four services a day called from Olney to provide a connection with Stratford services. The 1920s saw Towcester at its busiest on weekday mornings at 9am, with three passenger services scheduled to depart: one for Banbury, one for Broom and one for Blisworth. The station also saw special services for Towcester Racecourse, which was particularly known for the Grafton Hunt Steeplechase on Easter Mondays which attracted between 7,000 and 8,000 visitors to the town.

The routes into Towcester began to close to passengers from the beginning of the 1950s: Banbury to Towcester closed entirely on 30 June 1951  and Blisworth to Stratford closed to passengers on 7 April 1952. The line to Cockley Brake junction was lifted towards the end of 1955 and the SMJ's station at Blisworth closed to passengers in 1960. The section from Towcester to Ravenstone Wood junction remained used by freight until June 1958, and the line south to Olney closed as a result of the construction of the M1 motorway. The last section to remain open was from Woodford West junction to Blisworth which closed to goods in February 1964.

Present day 
The station buildings, which were of no interest to the local community, were demolished to be replaced by a light industrial estate, a Tesco supermarket and a car salesroom. The Towcester bypass has severed the trackbed near Greens Norton junction, but a section of embankment remains intact to the south of the road.

References

External links 
The SMJ Society

Disused railway stations in Northamptonshire
Former Stratford-upon-Avon and Midland Junction Railway stations
Railway stations in Great Britain opened in 1866
Railway stations in Great Britain closed in 1964
1866 establishments in England
Towcester